The 1977 South African Grand Prix (formally the XXIII The Citizen Grand Prix of South Africa) was a Formula One motor race held at Kyalami on 5 March 1977, won by Niki Lauda of Austria. The race is principally remembered for the accident that resulted in the deaths of race marshal Frederick Jansen van Vuuren and driver Tom Pryce. It was also the last race for Carlos Pace, who was killed in an aircraft accident less than two weeks later.

Practice sessions
The first two practice sessions were wet, and only a dozen cars took part in the first session, with Hans-Joachim Stuck fastest in his March despite having to abandon the session with an oil pressure issue. Eighteen cars took to the track during the second session, with Tom Pryce fastest in the Shadow despite brake problems. Three drivers did not take part in either timed session thus far: Patrick Depailler, Pryce's team-mate Renzo Zorzi (engine) and Boy Hayje.

The last timed session was dry, and therefore all the qualifying times came from this session. James Hunt took his third consecutive pole position, with Carlos Pace beside him on the front row. Niki Lauda took third despite a broken seat and tyre problems, alongside Depailler, ahead of Ronnie Peterson. Mario Andretti was sixth despite an engine failure. Other drivers who experienced mechanical problems included Jochen Mass (handling), Vittorio Brambilla (engine), Hans Binder (engine), Pryce (engine), Zorzi (fuel metering unit, electrics, exhaust), Alex Ribeiro (handling), Hayje (brakes) and Larry Perkins (water pump), while Brett Lunger only managed one flying lap before his engine failed.

Start and first 21 laps
James Hunt led off at the start, with Niki Lauda and local driver Jody Scheckter following him after Carlos Pace struggled. Tom Pryce lost ground at the start, leaving him 22nd, ahead only of Larry Perkins, although he quickly gained places, climbing to 16th by the end of lap six. On the same lap Ronnie Peterson dropped out while eighth, with a fuel pressure problem. The order at the front stayed put until lap seven when Lauda took the lead and was never passed again, with Scheckter taking second from Hunt 11 laps later.

Lap 23 fatal incident
On lap 22, the Shadow-Ford of Italian driver Renzo Zorzi, running 19th, pulled off to the left side of the main straight, just after the brow of a hill and a bridge over the track. He was again having problems with his fuel metering unit, and fuel was pumping directly onto the engine, which then caught fire. Zorzi did not immediately get out of his car as he could not disconnect the oxygen pipe from his helmet.

The situation caused two marshals from the pit wall on the opposite side of the track to intervene. The first marshal to cross the track was a 25-year-old panel beater named William (Bill). The second was 19-year-old Frederik "Frikkie" Jansen van Vuuren, who was carrying a  fire extinguisher. George Witt, the chief pit marshal for the race, said that the policy of the circuit was that in case of fire, two marshals must attend and a further two act as back-up in case the first pair's extinguishers were not effective enough. Witt also recalled that both marshals crossed the track without prior permission. The former narrowly made it across the track, but the latter did not. As the two men started to run across the track, the cars driven by Hans-Joachim Stuck (12th) and Tom Pryce (13th) came over the brow of a rise in the track.

Pryce was directly behind Stuck's car along the main straight. Stuck saw Jansen van Vuuren and moved to the right to avoid both marshals, missing Bill by what journalist David Tremayne, calls "millimetres". From his position Pryce could not see Jansen van Vuuren and was unable to react as quickly as Stuck had done. He struck the teenage marshal at approximately 270 km/h (170 mph). Jansen van Vuuren was thrown into the air and landed in front of Zorzi and Bill. He died on impact, and his body was badly mutilated by Pryce's car. The fire extinguisher he had been carrying smashed into Pryce's head, before striking the Shadow's roll hoop. The force of the impact was such that the extinguisher was thrown up and over the adjacent grandstand. It landed in the car park to the rear of the stand, where it hit a parked car and jammed its door shut.

The impact with the fire extinguisher wrenched Pryce's helmet upward sharply. Death was almost certainly instantaneous. Pryce's Shadow DN8, now with its driver dead at the wheel, continued at speed down the main straight towards the first corner, called Crowthorne. The car left the track to the right, scraping the metal barriers, hitting an entrance for emergency vehicles, and veering back onto the track. It then hit 14th-placed Jacques Laffite's Ligier, sending both Pryce and Laffite head-on into the catch fencing and a concrete wall. Jansen van Vuuren's injuries were so extensive that, initially, his body was identified only after the race director had summoned all of the race marshals the next day and he was not among them.

Finish
Lauda's Ferrari was barely able to finish the race after his car had picked up part of Pryce's roll bar in the underside of its monocoque, after the fatal accident. This damaged the car's water system and at the end of the race, the team found that only a third of the usual twelve litres of water remained in the system. Both the warnings for oil pressure and water temperature had been flashing at Lauda for the final 25 laps, in a car which he later described as 'completely finished'.

Despite this, Lauda held on to win his first victory since his near-fatal crash at the 1976 German Grand Prix the previous year. South African Scheckter was second, and Patrick Depailler's six-wheeler took third from Hunt in the closing laps. At first Lauda announced it was the greatest victory of his career, but when told on the victory podium of Pryce's death, he said that "there was no joy after that".

Aftermath
The sport reacted with sorrow at the loss of two young men. Tyrrell mechanic Trevor Foster viewed the incident from a distance, later recalling 

David Tremayne, a veteran biographer and motor sports journalist, recalled the feelings of disbelief and horror following the aftermath of the incident; 

The event was included in the motor racing film The Quick and the Dead.

Classification

Qualifying classification

Race Classification

Championship standings after the race

Drivers' Championship standings

Constructors' Championship standings

Note: Only the top five positions are included for both sets of standings.

Notes

References

Sources
 

South African Grand Prix
South African Grand Prix
Grand Prix
March 1977 sports events in Africa